Delphinella is a genus of fungi belonging to the family Dothioraceae.

Species

The genus has 7 accepted species:

Delphinella abietis 
Delphinella balsameae 
Delphinella deviata 
Delphinella peckii 
Delphinella polyspora 
Delphinella strobiligena

References

Dothideales
Dothideomycetes genera
Fungi of Europe